Manuae is the name of several islands in the South Pacific Ocean, including:
 Manuae (Cook Islands) in the Cook Islands
 Manuae (Society Islands) in French Polynesia